Big Bad Noise is the second album by Australian rock band The Choirboys which was released in 1988. This album was produced by Peter Blyton (The Radiators, Machinations), Brian McGee (The Rolling Stones, Cyndi Lauper) and The Choirboys. The album peaked at No. 5 on the Kent Music Report Albums Chart, it was certified double platinum and ranked No. 21 for 1988 in Australia.

It featured their number 3 Australian hit and most popular song "Run to Paradise". Other singles from the album included "Boys Will Be Boys" and "Struggle Town" reaching No. 14 and No. 34 respectively.

Track listing 
 "Run to Paradise"
 "Struggle Town"
 "Boys Will Be Boys"
 "Brave New World"
 "Guilty"
 "Like Fire"
 "Big Bad Noise"
 "Fireworks"
 "Gasoline"
 "One Hot Day"
 "Last Night of My LIfe"
 "Struck by Lightning"
 "James Dale"

References
 
General
  Note: Archived [on-line] copy has limited functionality.
  Note: [on-line] version established at White Room Electronic Publishing Pty Ltd in 2007 and was expanded from the 2002 edition.
Specific

External links
Official Choirboys site

1987 albums
Mushroom Records albums